The 2019 Madrid Open (sponsored by Mutua) was a professional tennis tournament played on outdoor clay courts at the Park Manzanares in Madrid, Spain from 3–12 May 2019. It was the 18th edition of the event on the ATP Tour and 11th on the WTA Tour. It was classified as an ATP Tour Masters 1000 event on the 2019 ATP Tour and a Premier Mandatory event on the 2019 WTA Tour. This event was the final professional tennis tournament for Spanish player David Ferrer, who received a wildcard into the singles draw.

Ion Țiriac, the event owner, announced in April 2019 that he has extended his sponsorship contract of the Mutua Madrid Open for 10 additional years, until 2031. Because he agreed to continue in Madrid, Țiriac will receive more than 30 million euros from the city of Madrid in the coming years.

Points and prize money

Point distribution

Prize money

ATP singles main-draw entrants

Seeds
The following are the seeded players. Seedings are based on ATP rankings as of 29 April 2019. Rankings and points before are as of 6 May 2019.

† The player did not qualify for the tournament in 2018. Accordingly, points for his 18th best result are deducted instead.

The following players would have been seeded, but they withdrew from the event. 

‡ The player is entitled to use an exemption to skip the tournament and substitute his 18th best result (45 points) in its stead.

Other entrants
The following players received wildcards into the main draw:
  Félix Auger-Aliassime
  Alejandro Davidovich Fokina
  David Ferrer  
  Jaume Munar

The following player received entry using a protected ranking into the main draw:
  Jo-Wilfried Tsonga

The following players received entry from the qualifying draw:
  Hugo Dellien 
  Taylor Fritz
  Pierre-Hugues Herbert
  Hubert Hurkacz
  Martin Kližan
  Reilly Opelka 
  Albert Ramos Viñolas

The following player received entry as a lucky loser:
  Adrian Mannarino

Withdrawals
Before the tournament
 Kevin Anderson → replaced by  Jan-Lennard Struff
 John Isner → replaced by  Andreas Seppi
 Milos Raonic → replaced by  Radu Albot
 Jo-Wilfried Tsonga → replaced by  Adrian Mannarino

During the tournament
 Marin Čilić

Retirements
 Reilly Opelka

ATP doubles main-draw entrants

Seeds

Rankings are as of April 29, 2019.

Other entrants
The following pairs received wildcards into the doubles main draw: 
  Roberto Carballés Baena /  Jaume Munar 
  Nick Kyrgios /  Bernard Tomic 
  David Marrero /  Fernando Verdasco

The following pair received entry as alternates:
  Austin Krajicek /  Artem Sitak

Withdrawals
Before the tournament
  Nicolas Mahut

During the tournament
  Marcelo Demoliner
  Grigor Dimitrov
  Daniil Medvedev

Retirements
  Marcel Granollers

WTA singles main-draw entrants

Seeds
The following are the seeded players. Seedings are based on WTA rankings as of 29 April 2019. Rankings and points before are as of 6 May 2019.

The following player would have been seeded, but she withdrew from the event.

Other entrants
The following players received wildcards into the main draw:
  Lara Arruabarrena
  Irina-Camelia Begu
  Sorana Cîrstea
  Svetlana Kuznetsova
  Sara Sorribes Tormo

The following players received entry from the qualifying draw:
  Margarita Gasparyan
  Polona Hercog
  Marta Kostyuk
  Kateryna Kozlova
  Kristina Mladenovic
  Kristýna Plíšková
  Anna Karolína Schmiedlová
  Vera Zvonareva

Withdrawals
Before the tournament
  Bianca Andreescu (shoulder injury) → replaced by  Pauline Parmentier
  Camila Giorgi → replaced by  Kirsten Flipkens
  Maria Sharapova (shoulder injury) → replaced by  Alizé Cornet
  Serena Williams → replaced by  Petra Martić
  Venus Williams → replaced by  Daria Gavrilova

During the tournament
  Angelique Kerber (right ankle injury)

Retirements
  Donna Vekić (right hip injury)
  Caroline Wozniacki (low back injury)

WTA doubles main-draw entrants

Seeds

Rankings are as of April 29, 2019.

Other entrants
The following pairs received wildcards into the doubles main draw:
  Aliona Bolsova /  Arantxa Parra Santonja
  Andreea Mitu /  Alexandra Panova
  Jeļena Ostapenko /  Vera Zvonareva
The following pair received entry as alternates:
  Aliaksandra Sasnovich /  Lesia Tsurenko

Withdrawals
Before the tournament
  Lara Arruabarrena (right hip injury)

Champions

Men's singles
 
  Novak Djokovic def.  Stefanos Tsitsipas, 6–3, 6–4

Women's singles
 
  Kiki Bertens def.  Simona Halep, 6–4, 6–4

Men's doubles
 
  Jean-Julien Rojer /  Horia Tecău def.  Diego Schwartzman /  Dominic Thiem 6–2, 6–3

Women's doubles
 
  Hsieh Su-wei /  Barbora Strýcová def.  Gabriela Dabrowski /  Xu Yifan, 6–3, 6–1

References

External links
 Official website